Upaasna is a 1971 Bollywood drama film directed by Mohan. The film stars Sanjay Khan, Mumtaz and Feroz Khan. The film has a very melodious song "Aao Tumhe Main Pyaar Sikha Du, Sikhla Do Na". Other songs are "Darpan Ko Dekha" and "Meri Jawani Pyaar Ko Tarse".

Cast

Soundtrack

External links
 

1971 films
1970s Hindi-language films
1971 drama films
Films scored by Kalyanji Anandji